Albert Keck (4 August 1930 – June 1990) is a German former footballer who played internationally for Saarland.

References

1930 births
1990 deaths
Association football defenders
Saar footballers
Saarland international footballers
1. FC Saarbrücken players
Sportspeople from Saarbrücken
Footballers from Saarland